Hollins Hill is a gritstone hill in the Derbyshire Peak District near the village of Hollinsclough. The hill is the source of Swallow Brook, which flows into the River Dove running along the south side of the hill.

The Bronze Age burial mound at the summit is a protected Scheduled Monument. It was excavated by Thomas Bateman in 1851 and subsequently by Micah Salt in 1894. Their finds included human bones, burnt from cremation, in a grave cut into the rock.

The east side of the hill is designated as 'Open Access' land, following the Countryside and Rights of Way Act 2000.

Hollins Hill is one of the 95 Ethels hills of the Peak District, launched by the countryside charity CPRE in 2021.

References 

Mountains and hills of the Peak District
Mountains and hills of Derbyshire